Mount Patterson is a mountain peak located in Mono County, California.

See also
Sweetwater Mountains

References

Mountains of Mono County, California
Mountains of Northern California